Paul Ackford (born 26 February 1958) is a former English rugby union international who played lock forward. He was formerly an inspector in the Metropolitan Police, and is now a columnist for The Telegraph.

Early life
Ackford was born in Hanover, West Germany.

Education
He was educated at Plymouth College, the University of Kent (BA) and Cambridge University (MA), he played lock for England B aged 21 and represented Cambridge in the 1979 Varsity Match, but did not make an impact until joining Harlequins and the Police in 1983.

Career
After impressing for the London Division against the touring Wallabies, he made his England debut on 5 November 1988 against Australia, aged 30.

Partnering police constable Wade Dooley, Ackford became an important part of the new side captained by Will Carling. He went on the 1989 British Lions tour to Australia, where he played in all three tests.

In 1990 he was knocked unconscious when blindsided by the young Argentine front row forward Federico Mendez, which saw Mendez sent off. Mendez later claimed it was a case of mistaken identity, and that he had meant to hit Jeff Probyn, because he had "stamped on my goolies". Ackford was part of the England side which won the Five Nations Grand Slam in 1991.  He retired from international rugby after the 1991 World Cup, won by Australia, becoming a journalist and writing for the Sunday Telegraph.

References

External links
Planet-rugby stats and bio
 Sporting heroes 1
sporting heroes 2
 Telegraph.co.uk

1958 births
Alumni of St John's College, Cambridge
Cambridge University R.U.F.C. players
The Daily Telegraph people
England international rugby union players
English rugby union players
Harlequin F.C. players
Living people
Metropolitan Police officers
People educated at Plymouth College
Rosslyn Park F.C. players
Rugby union locks
Alumni of the University of Kent
British & Irish Lions rugby union players from England